Pix Pâtisserie is a bakery in Portland, Oregon.

Description and history 

Pix operates a dessert and wine bar on East Burnside Street, as well as an outdoor vending machine called Pix-O-Matic.

The business was established in 2001, alongside adjoining Bar Vivant. Pix hosted a Bastille Day block party in 2011.

Reception 
Samantha Bakall of The Oregonian included Pix in a 2014 list of Portland's 10 best wine bars. In 2017, she also included the business in a list of "Portland's best dessert spots for Valentine's Day", and the newspaper's Michael Russell said Pix "might have the best Champagne list in the country". Thom Hilton included Pix and Bar Vivant in Eater Portland's 2022 list of "14 Spots for Late-Night Dining in Portland".

See also 
 List of bakeries

References

External links 

 
 

2001 establishments in Oregon
Bakeries of Oregon
Kerns, Portland, Oregon
Northeast Portland, Oregon
Pâtisserie
Restaurants established in 2001
Restaurants in Portland, Oregon
Wine bars